Israel's national under-19 football team, also known as Israel Under-19s or Israel U19s, is regarded as the feeder team for the Israel national under-21 football team.

This team is for Israeli players aged 19 (or under at the start of a two-year UEFA European Under-19 Championship campaign) so players may be up to 20 years old.  Also in existence are teams for Under-21s and Under-20s (for non-UEFA tournaments), Under-17s, and Under-16s.  Players are not level or nation static so can compete at any level as long as they are eligible; U19s do not relinquish level or nation association while competing and can compete on senior side, then back to U19s, and "youth level' or senior level with another country.

As of 2021, the Israel U19 home ground is the Netanya Stadium in the city of Netanya, Israel.

History
The idea to form a youth team first came about in 1957, as the IFA considered entering a team to the 1958 UEFA European Under-18 Championship tournament. The youth team, an U19 squad, played its debut match against its England equivalent on 20 May 1962, losing 1–3. Two days later, the team recorded its first victory, winning 2–1 in a rematch.

In 1964, the youth team participated for its debut time in the AFC Youth Championship tournament, sharing the cup with Burma in its first tournament. The team continued to win the title five more times in the next 8 years, before Israel was banned from participating in AFC tournaments.

Until 1992, the youth team's only official tournaments were FIFA Youth Championship qualification tournaments, twice participating in the process in the OFC U-20 Championship and once in the South American Youth Football Championship. At the same period of time, to give the youth squad its share of international matches, the IFA established an annual tournament for under-18 teams, which was held in December and January between 1974 and 1989 (after which the tournament became a tournament for under-17 teams).

In 1992, as Israel was admitted to UEFA, the squad began participating in the UEFA European Under-19 Championship (under-18 tournament until 2002), appearing in the final tournament in 1997 and 2014.

Israel qualified for the 2023 U20 World Cup by virtue of its performance at the 2022 U19 European Championships.

International records

FIFA U-20 World Cup

AFC U-19 Championship 

 Champions* : Title shared
 DNP : Did Not Participate
 DNQ : Did Not Qualify

FIFA World Youth Championship Intercontinental play-off 

* Despite both matches of Israel against Australia being hosted in the same city of Sydney, Australia – Australia still won on away goals.

OFC U-20 Championship

South American Youth Championship

UEFA European Under-18 Championship

UEFA European Under-19 Championship

Honours
AFC U-19 Championship:
Winners (6): 1964, 1965, 1966, 1967, 1971, 1972
Third Place (1): 1968
Fourth Place (1): 1969
OFC Championship:
Runners-up (2): 1985, 1986
UEFA European Under-19 Championship:
Runners-up (1): 2022

Results and fixtures

2022 UEFA European Under-19 Championship

Qualifiers

Qualifying Round – Group 4

Elite Round – Group 1

Qualified teams for the final tournament 

The following teams qualified for the final tournament of the 2022 UEFA European Under-19 Championship.

Note: All appearance statistics include only U-19 era (since 2002).

2022 UEFA European Under-19 Championship - Final tournament

Group stage 

The final tournament schedule was announced on 28 April 2022.

The group winners and runners-up advanced to the semi-finals and qualify for the 2023 FIFA U-20 World Cup.

Group B

Knockout stage

Bracket

FIFA U-20 World Cup play-off 

Winners qualified for the 2023 FIFA U-20 World Cup.

Semi-finals

Final

Coaching staff

Players

Current squad 

 The following players were called up for the 2023 UEFA European Under-19 Championship qualification matches.
 Match dates: 16, 19 and 22 November 2022
 Opposition: ,  and 
Caps and goals correct as of: 1 September 2022, after the match against .

Recent call-ups 
The following players have been called up for the team within the last twelve months and are still available for selection.

See also 
 UEFA European Under-19 Football Championship
 Israel national football team
 Israel national under-21 football team
 Israel national under-18 football team
 Israel national under-17 football team
 Israel national under-16 football team

References

F
Youth football in Israel
European national under-19 association football teams